Matrix remodeling associated 8 is a protein that in humans is encoded by the MXRA8 gene.

MXRA8 protein is a receptor for multiple arthritogenic alphaviruses, including chikungunya, Ross River, Mayaro and O'nyong nyong viruses.

References

Further reading